Melissa Broder is an author, essayist and poet. Her work includes novels The Pisces (Penguin Random House 2018) and Milk Fed (Simon and Schuster 2021), the poetry collection Last Sext (Tin House 2016), and essay collection So Sad Today (Grand Central 2016), as well as the popular Twitter feed also titled So Sad Today, on which the book is based. Broder has written for The New York Times, Elle, Vice, Vogue Italia, and New York magazine‘s The Cut.

Early life
Broder grew up in Bryn Mawr, Pennsylvania with her younger sister Hayley. Her father Bob was a tax lawyer and her mother owned a stationery store. She attended the Baldwin School and became interested in poetry early, writing her first collection in third grade.

Broder attended Tufts University where she edited the literary magazine Queen's Head and Artichoke. She graduated in 2001 with a degree in English and then moved to San Francisco, where she worked odd jobs before she relocated to New York City at 25. There she worked as a publicist for Penguin Books and attended night classes at City College of New York, earning an MFA in poetry.

Broder has been clean and sober since age 25.

Career

Poetry

Broder has published five collections of poetry, including Superdoom (August 2021). Broder won a Pushcart Prize for the poem "Forgotten Sound" included in her collection Last Sext.

Twitter
Broder began tweeting anonymously from her So Sad Today Twitter account in 2012. She began her So Sad Today column for Vice in December 2014.

She revealed herself as the account's author in a Rolling Stone interview in May 2015.

As of February 2021, the So Sad Today profile had more than 1 million followers.

So Sad Today
In 2016, Broder published a collection of personal essays, So Sad Today, based on her Twitter account. The collection includes some essays initially published in Vice under her So Sad Today pen name.

The Pisces
In 2018 Broder published the novel The Pisces, which garnered praise from The New York Times, The New Yorker, Vogue, and The Washington Post.

Milk Fed 
Broder published Milk Fed in 2021, a critically acclaimed novel which Kirkus described as "[b]old, dry, and delightfully dirty."

Other projects
Broder is adapting The Pisces for Lionsgate Films.

She also writes the Beauty and Death column for Elle. In 2020 it was announced a television show based on her novel Milk Fed was being developed. No news has emerged since then. 

The author records a podcast titled eating alone in my car in which she openly discusses her work, daily life, obsessions, and "rants about everything from mortality to Poptarts to depression". Broder has recorded near-weekly episodes of the "show" since May 2018.

Personal life
Broder is married and lives in Los Angeles. She is a caregiver for her husband who has a progressive neuroimmune disease that leaves him bedridden for months at a time.

Bibliography

Poetry 
 When You Say One Thing But Mean Your Mother (Ampersand Books, 2010)
 Meat Heart (Publishing Genius, 2012)
 Scarecrone (Publishing Genius, 2014)
 Last Sext (Tin House, 2016)
Superdoom: Selected Poems (Tin House, 2021)

Essay collection 
 So Sad Today (Grand Central, 2016)

Novels 
The Pisces (Penguin Random House, 2018)
Milk Fed (Simon and Schuster, 2021)

References

External links
 Official website
 @sosadtoday on Twitter
@melissabroder on Twitter

21st-century American poets
21st-century American women writers
American women essayists
21st-century American essayists
American women poets
Tufts University School of Arts and Sciences alumni
City College of New York alumni
People from Bryn Mawr, Pennsylvania
Poets from Pennsylvania
Novelists from Pennsylvania
American women novelists
21st-century American novelists
Living people
1979 births
The Baldwin School alumni